Two races have been known as the California 500:

Auto Club 500 is a NASCAR race held at the California Speedway which was called the "California 500 presented by NAPA" from 1997 to 1999
California 500 (Indycar) was an Indycar held at Ontario Motor Speedway from 1970 to 1980.